Dee Luong (born March 29, 1968) is a professional poker player from Henderson, Nevada. She made a final table of the World Series of Poker in 2003 and was featured in 2007 on the NBC television program Poker After Dark.

Biography
Luong was born in Vietnam and immigrated to the United States with her family at age 6, settling in San Gabriel, California. At age 21, she moved to Las Vegas, where professional poker player Huck Seed introduced her to high-stakes poker.

Luong has reached the final table in several major tournaments. In the 2003 L.A. Poker Classic limit Texas hold 'em event, she finished in third place, and six months later she finished third in the 2003 World Series of Poker limit hold 'em shootout. She has also won cash in a World Poker Tour event.

As of 2012, her total live tournament winnings exceed $90,000.

Notes

1968 births
Vietnamese poker players
American poker players
Vietnamese emigrants to the United States
People from San Gabriel, California
People from Henderson, Nevada
Female poker players
Living people
Place of birth missing (living people)